Parliamentary elections were held in Hungary on 9 April 2006, with a second round of voting in 110 of the 176 single-member constituencies on 23 April. The Hungarian Socialist Party (MSZP) emerged as the largest party in the National Assembly with 186 of the 386 seats, and continued the coalition government with the Alliance of Free Democrats (SZDSZ). It marked the first time a government had been re-elected since the end of Communist rule. To date, this is the most recent national election in Hungary not won by Fidesz-KDNP, and the last in which the victorious party did not win a two-thirds supermajority in parliament.

Electoral system
The unicameral National Assembly (Országgyűlés), the highest organ of state authority, initiates and approves legislation sponsored by the prime minister. A party had to win at least 5% of the national vote (based on the total of regional list votes) to form a parliamentary faction. The National Assembly had 386 members, elected for a four-year term in a mixed system: 176 members in single-seat constituencies by a modified two-round system, 152 in multi-seat constituencies by party-list proportional representation (using territorial lists) and 58 members (using a national list) to realize semi-proportional representation.

The election took over two days. On 9 April elections took place in every constituency, both single-seat and multi-seat. In order to get elected into a single-seat constituency, a candidate needs to receive more than 50% of the vote; in the 2006 elections, the victor received more than 50% of the vote in 66 of the 176 single-seat constituencies. There was another election in the remaining 110 single-seat constituencies in the 2nd round, in which all but the top three candidates (and every candidate reaching 15%) from the 1st round are excluded. Usually parties formed alliances between the two rounds and withdraw many of their 3rd place candidates and call for supporting the allied party so the winning candidate of the 2nd round will receive more than 50% of the vote. However, this process was not automatic, but grounded by negotiations.

The multi-seat elections also took place during the first round of voting. 146 of the 152 seats were filled using closed-list proportional representation. The remaining 6 were added to the national list calculation. The country was divided into 20 regions for the multi-seat elections with varying numbers of members per region. Where a party won more members in a region than it merited, the surplus votes were deducted from the total it received in the second round. Correspondingly, a party that received fewer seats than it merited had the shortfall votes added to its total in the second round.

A further 58 (plus 6 more not elected from the multi-seat constituencies in the first round) extra members were elected using a national list, which voter could not vote for directly, but indirectly through constituency and regional votes, in order to achieve a more proportional result.

Nomination 
Before the election the parties needed to be registered by the National Electoral Office. After registration the parties had the right to collect references. Each candidate had to collect 750 references in their district. If one party collected the required number in two districts (in Budapest 8, Pest 5 and Borsod-Abaúj-Zemplén 3) in a county, then it could present a list in regional constituencies. If a party had at least seven regional lists, it could present a national compensation list. 17 March was the last day when a party could be registered and a list or a candidate could be registered. By 28 February, 49 parties had sought registration, and 45 were registered by the National Electoral Office.

Campaign
On 10 April the two parties of the governing coalition MSZP-SZDSZ (Hungarian Socialist Party and Alliance of Free Democrats) announced their alliance for the second round. The Socialist Party withdrew three of their candidates in favour of the Alliance one, and the Alliance withdrew their remaining 55 candidates (all of which had finished third), and called on its voters to support the Socialists. The leaders of the two parties ran a common campaign between the two rounds.

The opposition was not united. The Hungarian Democratic Forum (MDF) which hit the 5% threshold contrary to the polls and expectations made it clear that they would not support Viktor Orbán's Fidesz party. Orbán tried to get their support by declaring that he resigned from Prime Minister candidacy, and sought a compromise candidate, Péter Ákos Bod, but the MDF held on to their independency; thus they did not withdraw their 3rd place candidates. However, some MDF candidates did not agree with this, and withdrew in favour of Fidesz.

Opinion polling

Results

See also
2006 protests in Hungary
2006 Hungarian local elections

References

Notes

External links
Országos Választási Iroda National Electoral Office
Online coverage of the elections, with the latest poll results Index.hu 

Hungary
Elections in Hungary
Parliamentary election
Hungary